The North American zone see the zones divided into two Caribbean, Central and Central American zones. The two Caribbean zones will meet and then go up against the Central American zone in the inter-zonal tournaments. Both Caribbean zones will have an elimination bracket where two teams per country competing in a two-game series, if there is a tie a fifth game will be played by both countries. In the second round of the bracket the series will be a best of three. The winner and runner up of the main bracket and of the repechage will advance to the next round. The winner of the 2010–12 Continental Beach Volleyball Cup will advance to the Olympics. 29 out of 31 possible nations entered plus two non-IOC members (Anguilla and Curaçao) entered both the men's and women's tournaments.

Men

Did not enter

Zonal

EVCA
This zonal tournament was held in St. John's, Antigua and Barbuda, in November 2010.

Repechage

Anguilla is not a member of the IOC, and thus was not able to qualify for the games.

CAZOVA
This zonal tournament was held in Chaguanas, Trinidad and Tobago, in December 2010.

Repechage

Curaçao is not a member of the IOC, and thus was not able to qualify for the games.

AFECAVOL
The competition was held in Montelimar, Nicaragua, in January 2011.

Repechage

Central
6 teams will compete, with the top 4 advancing to the next round. The competition was held in Boca Chica, Dominican Republic, in April 2011.

{{8TeamBracket
| RD1-seed1=1
| RD1-team1=
| RD1-score1=-
| RD1-seed2=
| RD1-team2=BYE
| RD1-score2=-
| RD1-seed3=4
| RD1-team3=
| RD1-score3=0
| RD1-seed4=5
| RD1-team4=
| RD1-score4=4
| RD1-seed5= 3
| RD1-team5=
| RD1-score5=4
| RD1-seed6=6
| RD1-team6=
| RD1-score6=0
| RD1-seed7=
| RD1-team7=BYE
| RD1-score7=-
| RD1-seed8=
| RD1-team8=
| RD1-score8=
| RD2-seed1=1
| RD2-team1=| RD2-score1=1
| RD2-seed2=5
| RD2-team2=| RD2-score2=3| RD2-seed3=3
| RD2-team3=
| RD2-score3=1
| RD2-seed4=2
| RD2-team4=| RD2-score4=3| RD3-seed1=5
| RD3-team1=| RD3-score1=3| RD3-seed2=2
| RD3-team2=
| RD3-score2=2
}}RepechageInter-Zonal

ECVA vs. CAZOVA
The competition was held in Cayman Islands in December 2011.

 Repechage

AFECAVOL vs. ECVA/CAZOVA
The competition was held in Montelimar, Nicaragua, in February 2012.

 Repechage

Continental Cup Final

Women

Did not enter

Zonal

EVCA
This zonal tournament was held in St. John's, Antigua and Barbuda, in November 2010.RepechageCAZOVA
This zonal tournament was held in Chaguanas, Trinidad and Tobago, in December 2010.

AFECAVOL
The competition was held in Montelimar, Nicaragua, in January 2011.RepechageCentral
6 teams will compete, with the top 4 advancing to the next round. The competition was held in Boca Chica, Dominican Republic, in April 2011.Repechage'''

Inter-Zonal

ECVA vs. CAZOVA
The competition was held in Cayman Islands in December 2011.

 Repechage

AFECAVOL vs. ECVA/CAZOVA
The competition was held in Mal Pais, Costa Rica, in February 2012.

 Repechage

Continental Cup Final

See also
 Volleyball at the 2012 Summer Olympics

References

O
O
O
Continental Beach Volleyball Cup